Andrigo Oliveira de Araújo (born 27 February 1995), simply known as Andrigo, is a Brazilian footballer who plays as an attacking midfielder for FC Anyang.

Club career
Born in Estrela, Rio Grande do Sul, Andrigo began his career at nearby Sport Club Internacional. He was first integrated into the first team at the end of the 2014 Campeonato Brasileiro Série A season, remaining an unused substitute in victories over Sociedade Esportiva Palmeiras and Figueirense FC. He was part of the team that won the year's Copa do Brasil Sub-20, scoring the first goal of a 2–1 home win over Esporte Clube Vitória in the final (4–2 aggregate).

On 6 December 2015, he made his professional debut on the final day of the season, replacing Alex for the final 14 minutes of a 2–0 win over Cruzeiro Esporte Clube at Beira-Rio and receiving a yellow card.

Andrigo scored his first senior goal on 20 February 2016 in the year's Campeonato Gaúcho, concluding a 4–0 home win over Esporte Clube Cruzeiro four minutes after replacing Eduardo Sasha. On 9 May 2017, after being sparingly used in Inter's first-ever relegation to Campeonato Brasileiro Série B, he was loaned to Atlético Goianiense until December.

In 2022, Andrigo joined FC Anyang of K League 2.

International career
Andrigo played for Brazil's victorious under-17 team at the 2011 South American Under-17 Football Championship, starting twice in six appearances.

Honours
Brazil U17
South American Under-17 Football Championship: 2011

References

External links

1995 births
Living people
Sportspeople from Rio Grande do Sul
Brazilian footballers
Association football midfielders
Brazil youth international footballers
Campeonato Brasileiro Série A players
Campeonato Brasileiro Série B players
K League 2 players
Sport Club Internacional players
Atlético Clube Goianiense players
Ceará Sporting Club players
Sport Club do Recife players
Esporte Clube Vitória players
Figueirense FC players
Centro Sportivo Alagoano players
Guarani FC players
FC Anyang players
Expatriate footballers in South Korea
Brazilian expatriate sportspeople in South Korea